Caviziphius is a fossil genus of ziphiid or beaked whale from the Miocene of Belgium, Spain and Portugal. The type species is Caviziphius altirostris.

References

Ziphiids
Prehistoric cetacean genera
Fossil taxa described in 1997
Miocene cetaceans
Fossils of Spain
Pliocene cetaceans